Nandana Fort or Nandna Fort was a fort built at strategic location on a hilly range on the eastern flanks of the Salt Range in Punjab. Its ruins, including those of a town and a temple, are present.

History
It was ruled by the Hindu Shahi kings until, in the early 11th century, Mahmud of Ghazni expelled them from Nandana. Al-Biruni carried out his measurements of the circumference of the Earth here.

The Tourism Development Corporation of Punjab (TDCP) was tasked by the Prime Ministers Office to rehabilitate the site with the aim of making it an international tourist destination. Prime Minister Imran Khan had been informed of the decrepit state of the site by his wife's nephew, Shahroze Khan, who had previously heard about the state of the fort from Paul Salopek, a New York Times contributor. In February 2021, the PM and several aides and cabinet members attended an official event celebrating the restoration of the site. 

Anandapala, the son of Jayapala of the Hindu Shahi dynasty, had erected the Shiva temple in Nandana.

See also
List of UNESCO World Heritage Sites in Pakistan
List of forts in Pakistan
List of museums in Pakistan
List of cultural heritage sites in Punjab, Pakistan

References

External links

 Nandana Fort, Tourism Development Corporation of Punjab

Archaeological sites in Pakistan
Archaeological sites in Punjab, Pakistan
Cultural heritage sites in Punjab, Pakistan
Forts in Punjab, Pakistan
History of Pakistan
History of Punjab
Buildings and structures in Punjab, Pakistan
Tourist attractions in Punjab, Pakistan